Verners Auls (born 5 August 1889, date of death unknown) was a Latvian figure skater. He competed in the men's singles event at the 1936 Winter Olympics.

References

External links

1889 births
Year of death missing
Latvian male single skaters
Olympic figure skaters of Latvia
Figure skaters at the 1936 Winter Olympics
Sportspeople from Riga